Clinidium centrale is a species of ground beetle in the subfamily Rhysodinae. It was described by Antoine Henri Grouvelle in 1903. It is endemic to Costa Rica. Clinidium centrale measure  in length.

References

Clinidium
Beetles of Central America
Endemic fauna of Costa Rica
Beetles described in 1903